Luiz Floriano Bonfá (17 October 1922 – 12 January 2001) was a Brazilian guitarist and composer. He was best known for the music he composed for the film Black Orpheus.

Biography
Luiz Floriano Bonfá was born on October 17, 1922, in Rio de Janeiro.  He began studying with Uruguayan classical guitarist Isaías Sávio at the age of 11. These weekly lessons entailed a long, harsh commute (on foot, plus two and half hours on train) from his family home in Santa Cruz, in the western rural outskirts of Rio de Janeiro, to the teacher's home in the hills of Santa Teresa. Given Bonfá's extraordinary dedication and talent for the guitar, Sávio excused the youngster's inability to pay for his lessons.

Bonfá first gained widespread exposure in Brazil in 1947 when he was featured on Rio's Rádio Nacional, then an important showcase for up-and-coming talent. He was a member of the vocal group Quitandinha Serenaders in the late 1940s. Some of his first compositions such as "Ranchinho de Palha", "O Vento Não Sabe", were recorded and performed by Brazilian crooner Dick Farney in the 1950s. Bonfá's first hit song was "De Cigarro em Cigarro" recorded by Nora Ney in 1957. It was through Farney that Bonfá was introduced to Antônio Carlos Jobim and Vinicius de Moraes, the leading songwriting team behind the worldwide explosion of the great Bossa Nova in the late 1950s to 1970s, becoming a fever in the US. Bonfá collaborated with them and with other prominent Brazilian musicians and artists in productions of de Moraes' anthological play Orfeu da Conceição, which several years later gave origin to Marcel Camus' film Black Orpheus (Orfeu Negro in Portuguese). In the burgeoning days of Rio de Janeiro's thriving jazz scene, it was commonplace for musicians, artists, and dramatists to collaborate in such theatrical presentations. Bonfá wrote some of the original music featured in the film, including the numbers "Samba de Orfeu" and his most famous composition, "Manhã de Carnaval" (of which Carl Sigman later wrote a different set of English lyrics titled "A Day in the Life of a Fool"), which has been among the top ten standards played worldwide, according to The Guinness Book of World Records.

As a composer and performer, Bonfá was an exponent of the bold, lyrical, lushly orchestrated, and emotionally charged samba-canção style that predated the arrival of João Gilberto's more refined and subdued bossa nova style. Jobim, João Donato, Dorival Caymmi, and other contemporaries were also essentially samba-canção musicians until the sudden, massive popularity of the young Gilberto's unique style of guitar playing and expressively muted vocals transformed the music of the day into the music of the future. Camus' film and Gilberto's and Jobim's collaborations with American jazzmen such as Stan Getz and Charlie Byrd did much to bring Brazilian popular music to the attention of the world, and Bonfá became a highly visible ambassador of Brazilian music in the United States beginning with the famous November 1962 Bossa Nova concert at New York's Carnegie Hall.

Bonfá worked with American musicians such as Quincy Jones, George Benson, Stan Getz, and Frank Sinatra, recording several albums while in U.S. Elvis Presley sang a Bonfá composition, "Almost in Love" with lyrics by Randy Starr in the 1968 MGM film Live a Little, Love a Little. Also of note is his "The Gentle Rain", with lyrics by Matt Dubey, ""Non-Stop To Brazil"" (recorded by Astrud Gilberto) and "Sambolero". From 1990 to 1999, Bonfá worked with singer Ithamara Koorax on several recordings and concerts, appearing live with her as special guest at several venues in Rio de Janeiro such as Teatro Rival, BNDES Auditorium and Funarte-Sidney Miller Hall. They also recorded together, in 1996, the album Almost In Love - Ithamara Koorax Sings The Luiz Bonfá Songbook, featuring Bonfá on acoustic guitar plus special guests Larry Coryell, Eumir Deodato, Ron Carter, Marcos Suzano, and Sadao Watanabe. The sessions, produced by Arnaldo DeSouteiro, were filmed for a Japanese TV broadcast presented by Sadao Watanabe.

Bonfá wrote soundtracks for two dozens of movies, such as Black Orpheus,  O Santo Módico, Os Cafajestes, The Gentle Rain, Pour Un Amour Lointain, Le Ore dell'Amore, Carnival Of Crime and Prisoner Of Rio (on which he collaborated with arranger Hans Zimmer), among many others. He died of prostate cancer at 78 in Rio de Janeiro on January 12, 2001. At the time of his death, he was working in the soundtracks for a movie produced and starred by Karen Black and for a Broadway show titled Brazilian Bombshell based in the life of Carmen Miranda and to be starred by Sonia Braga.

Legacy
In 2005, Smithsonian Folkways Recordings released an album of Bonfá's work, entitled Solo in Rio 1959, which included previously unreleased material from the original recording session.

In 2008, Universal Music France released a coffee table book containing two CDs which included previously unreleased material of the Black Orpheus soundtrack, and a DVD. Also in 2008, Universal Music released The Brazilian Scene, Braziliana and Black Orpheus celebrating the 50th anniversary of the bossa nova.

Bonfá's major legacy continues to be his compositions from the Black Orpheus soundtrack, most notably the instantly recognizable bossa nova classic "Manhã de Carnaval". But Bonfá's discography also attests to his uniquely inventive mastery of Brazilian jazz guitar. Bonfá's guitar style was brassier and more penetrating than that of his major contemporary, João Gilberto, and Bonfá was a frequent and adept soloist whereas Gilberto plays his own suave, intricate brand of rhythm guitar almost exclusively. Bonfá often played solo guitar in a polyphonic style, harmonizing melody lines in a manner similar to that made famous by Wes Montgomery in the US, or playing lead and rhythm parts simultaneously. As a composer and as a guitarist, Bonfá played a pivotal role in bridging the incumbent samba-canção style with the innovations of the bossa nova movement.

Bonfa's instrumental "Seville" from his 1967 LP Luiz Bonfa Plays Great Songs is the basis for the 2011 hit "Somebody That I Used to Know" by Belgian-Australian musician Gotye.  Gotye's song charted No. 1 in 27 countries.

Many other Bonfa's songs have been heavily sampled by MCs, rappers and DJs of the hip-hop generation. "Bonfá Nova" was sampled by Brazilian rapper Marcelo D2 on the hit song "À Procura da Batida Perfeita," "Jacarandá" was sampled by the group Planet Hemp on "Se Liga", "Bahia Soul" was sampled by the British band Smoke City on their biggest hit "Underwater Love" and "Saudade Vem Correndo" became the hip-hero anthem "Runnin'" recorded by The Pharcyde.

Discography

 1955 Luiz Bonfá (10", Continental LPP-21)
 1956 De Cigarro em Cigarro (10", Continental LPP-53)
 1956 Noite e Dia with Eduardo Lincoln (Continental LPP-3018)
 1956 Meia-Noite em Copacabana (Polydor LPNG 4004)
 1956 Edu N.2 (Rádio 0036-V)
 1956 Orfeu da Conceição (Odeon MODB-3056)
 1957 Alta Versatilidade (Odeon MOFB-3003)
 1957 Violão Boêmio (Odeon MOFB-3014)
 1958 Ritmo Continentais (Odeon MOFB-3020)
 1958 Bonfafá with Fafá Lemos (Odeon MOFB-3047)
 1958 Luiz Bonfá e Silvia Telles (Odeon BWB-1040)
 1958 Meu Querido Violão (Odeon MOFB-3076)
 1958 Toca Melodias das Américas (Imperial 30009)
 1958 ¡Amor! The Fabulous Guitar of Luiz Bonfa (Atlantic SD 8028)
 1959 Black Orpheus (Orfeu Negro) O.S.T., with Antônio Carlos Jobim (Epic LN3672; 10", Philips B76.470R; re-released also on Fontana and Verve)
 1959 O Violão de Luiz Bonfá (Cook 1134)
 1960 A Voz e o Violão with Norma Suely (Odeon MOFB-3144)
 1960 Passeio no Rio (Odeon BWB-1151)
 1961 Pery Ribeiro (Odeon 7BD-1011)
 1961 Luiz Bonfá (Odeon 7BD-1017)
 1961 Pery Ribeiro e Seu Mundo de Canções Românticas with Pery Ribeiro (Odeon MOFB-3272)
 1961 Sócio de Alcova (RCA LCD-1007)
 1962 O Violão e o Samba (Odeon MOFB 3295)
 1962 Le Roi de la Bossa Nova (Fontana 680.228ML)
 1962 Bossa Nova no Carnegie Hall (Audio Fidelity AFLP 2101)
 1962 Luiz Bonfá Plays and Sings Bossa Nova (Verve V6-8522)
 1962 Le Ore dell'amore (C.A.M. CEP.45-102)
 1963 Caterina Valente e Luiz Bonfá (London LLN 7090)
 1963 Jazz Samba Encore! with Stan Getz (Verve V6-8523)
 1963 Recado Novo de Luiz Bonfá (Odeon MOFB 3310)
 1963 Violão Boêmio Vol. 2 (Odeon SMOFB 3360)
 1964 Rio with Paul Winter (Columbia CS 9115)
 1965 The Gentle Rain O.S.T., with Eumir Deodato (Mercury SR 61016)
 1965 Quincy Plays for Pussycats with Quincy Jones (Mercury SR 61050)
 1965 The Shadow of Your Smile (Verve V6-8629)
 1965 Braziliana with Maria Helena Toledo (Philips PHS 600-199)
 1965 The New Sound of Brazil with João Donato (RCA LSP-3473)
 1965 The Movie Song Album with Tony Bennett (Columbia CS 9272)
 1965 The Brazilian Scene (Philips PHS 600-208)
 1967 Pour un amour lointain (United Artists 36.123 UAE)
 1967 Luiz Bonfá (Dot DLP 25804)
 1967 Stevie & Eydie, Bonfá & Brazil with Steve Lawrence and Eydie Gormé (Columbia CS 9530)
 1967 Luiz Bonfa Plays Great Songs (Dot DLP 25825)
 1968 Black Orpheus Impressions (Dot DLP 25848)
 1968 Bonfá (Dot DLP 25881)
 1969 My Way with Frank Sinatra (Reprise FS 1029)
 1969 I Got a Woman and Some Blues with George Benson (A&M SP-9-3025)
 1970 The New Face of Bonfa (RCA LSP-4376)
 1971 Sanctuary (RCA LSP-4591)
 1972 Introspection (RCA FSP-297)
 1973 Jacarandá (Ranwood R-8112)
 1978 Bonfá Burrows Brazil (Cherry Pie CPF 1045)
 1986 For A Distant Love with Yana Purim (Pausa Records PR 7203)
 1989 Non-Stop to Brazil (Chesky JD29)
 1992 The Bonfá Magic (Caju Music 511.404-2) re-released also on Milestone Records and JVC Victor
 1992 The Brazil Project with Toots Thielemans (Private Music 82101)
 1992 The Brazil Project 2 with Toots Thielemans (Private Music 82110)
 1995 Rio Vermelho/Red River with Ithamara Koorax (Imagem 2012) 
 1996 Almost In Love - Ithamara Koorax Sings The Luiz Bonfá Songbook (Paddle Wheel KICP 503)
 1997 Here In My Heart with Kenny Rankin (Private Music 0100582148-2)
 2003 Love Dance with Ithamara Koorax (Milestone MCD 9327-2)
 2005 Solo in Rio 1959 (Smithsonian Folkways SFW CD 40483)
 2015 Strange Message

References

External links 

 "Luiz Bonfá, The Brazilian Wizard" by Brian Hodel
 Nos Bastidores do Concerto de Bossa Nova no Carnegie Hall 1962
 Solo in Rio, 1959 album details at Smithsonian Folkways
 
 
 Luiz Bonfá discography with album art and descriptions by Koichi and Motoko Yasuoka
  with Steve Lawrence in 1973

1922 births
2001 deaths
APRA Award winners
Bossa nova guitarists
Brazilian composers
Brazilian film score composers
Brazilian jazz guitarists
Brazilian male guitarists
Composers for the classical guitar
Chesky Records artists
Dot Records artists
Jazz fusion guitarists
Male film score composers
Milestone Records artists
RCA Records artists
Verve Records artists
20th-century guitarists
20th-century male musicians
Male jazz musicians